XHMRI-FM is a radio station in Mérida, Yucatán. Broadcasting on 93.7 FM, XHMRI is owned by Grupo Rivas and carries a grupera format known as La Reverenda.

It is simulcast in eastern Yucatán on XHMET-FM 91.9 in Temozon.

History
The station's concession was awarded in 1991; it has always been owned by the Rivas family from Mérida, Yucatán, México.

References

Spanish-language radio stations
Radio stations in Yucatán
Radio stations established in 1991